The 2017–18 Liberty Flames men's basketball team represented Liberty University in the 2017–18 NCAA Division I men's basketball season. The team played its home games in Lynchburg, Virginia for the 28th consecutive season at Vines Center, with a capacity of 8,085. The team was led by Ritchie McKay, who was in his fifth season, but third season since his return to the program. They were members of the Big South Conference. They finished the season 22–14, 9–9 in Big South play to finish in a four-way tie for fifth place. They defeated Campbell and UNC Asheville to advance to the championship game of the Big South tournament where they lost to Radford. They were invited to the CollegeInsider.com Tournament where they defeated North Carolina A&T in the first round in a game referred to as the Jim Phelan Classic. They received a second round bye and defeated Central Michigan in the quarterfinals before losing in the semifinals to UIC.

This was Liberty's final season as members of the Big South Conference, as the school announced on May 17, 2018 that they will be moving to the ASUN Conference for the 2018–19 season.

Previous season
The Flames finished the 2016–17 season 21–14, 14–4 in Big South play to finish in a third place. They were upset in Quarterfinals of the Big South tournament by Radford. They were invited to the CollegeInsider.com Tournament where they defeated Norfolk State in the first round to be champions of the Coach John McLendon Classic. In the Second Round they defeated Samford before losing in the quarterfinals to UMBC.

Departures

2017–18 Newcomers

Roster

Roster is subject to change as/if players transfer or leave the program for other reasons.

Schedule and results

|-
!colspan=12 style=|Exhibition

|-
!colspan=12 style=|Non-conference regular season

|-
!colspan=12 style=| Big South regular season

|-
!colspan=12 style=|Big South tournament

|-
!colspan=12 style=|CIT

References

Liberty Flames basketball seasons
Liberty
Liberty Fl
Liberty Fl
Liberty